InterContinental Manila (colloquially Intercon/ICM) was a five-star InterContinental hotel located on Ayala Avenue in Makati, Metro Manila, Philippines. At the time of its closure, it is the longest operating international chain hotel in the Philippines. It was designed by National Artist Leandro Locsin.

The hotel opened on April 11, 1969 and ceased operations on December 31, 2015. It was the first 5-star hotel in Makati and the second InterContinental hotel in Asia. All of its 332 guest rooms and suites were updated in 2006 to incorporate traditional and modern Filipino design.

History
A press released in 1958 on the building then dubbed as Rizal InterContinental Hotel, lists Rizal Development Corporation and Pan American Airways as developers of the hotel. The initial 1958 design of the hotel was not followed and shelved. Construction of the hotel would be completed ten years later in 1969, and was inaugurated as InterContinental Hotel Manila.

The InterContinental property is owned by Ayala Land Hotel's wholly owned subsidiary, Ayala Land Hotels and Resorts Corp. and has been under the InterContinental Hotels Group since 1969.

Closure

The hotel ceased operations on December 31, 2015, when the hotel management contract between the subsidiary of AyalaLand Hotels and Resorts Corp and InterContinental Hotels Group ended. The hotel would then be replaced by One Ayala, a new mixed-used development which includes an intermodal transport facility, two new hotels including Ayala's Seda Hotel, two office towers, and a convention tower.

Awards
1982/83  "Best Hotel kikay Festival" for "Festival Gastronomique le Kikay bleu"
Ordre Mondial des Gourmets Gustateurs 'Trés  Belle Carte (Best Wine List) Award for the Prince Albert Rotisserie
1997 the hotel placed first in Asia Pacific and third in the world in the D'Richey Report  
1998 Green Globe Award for outstanding environmental programs
2002 "Outstanding in Community Involvement for Southern Asia" among InterContinental hotels
2007 voted by readers of Business Traveler Magazine Asia Pacific as one of the three top hotels in the Philippines
2010 TTG Travel Awards as the Best City Hotel – Manila  
2011 TTG Travel Awards as the Best City Hotel – Manila  
2012 TTG Travel Awards as the Best City Hotel – Manila

References

External links
Official Website
Makati City Hotels

InterContinental Hotels Group
Hotels in Metro Manila
Hotels established in 1969
Hotel buildings completed in 1969
InterContinental hotels
Buildings and structures in Makati
Hotels disestablished in 2015
2015 disestablishments in the Philippines
Defunct hotels
Leandro Locsin buildings
Demolished hotels
Buildings and structures demolished in 2016
Demolished buildings and structures in the Philippines
Philippine companies established in 1969